West Beverly may refer to:

West Beverly, Chicago, city of Chicago, Illinois, United States
West Beverly, Visalia, city of Visalia, California, United States